Vernon Township is a township in Walsh County, North Dakota, United States.

References

Townships in North Dakota
Townships in Walsh County, North Dakota